Luis Ruiz Tagle (born 28 July 1898, date of death unknown) was a Chilean sports shooter. He competed in the 50 m pistol event at the 1948 Summer Olympics.

References

1898 births
Year of death missing
Chilean male sport shooters
Olympic shooters of Chile
Shooters at the 1948 Summer Olympics
Sportspeople from Santiago
20th-century Chilean people